Kristján Helgason (born 27 March 1974) is an Icelandic former professional snooker player.

Career 

Born in 1974, Helgason turned professional in 1995. In 1998, he reached the last 48 at the Irish Open, losing 3–5 to Billy Snaddon, but made no further progress in any tournament that season.

The following season, he reached the last 32 at the 2000 Scottish Open, where he defeated Nick Pearce, John Read and Jamie Burnett before losing 3–5 to Mark Williams. In that year's World Championship, he beat Joe Jogia, John Lardner, Joe Johnson, Rod Lawler and Terry Murphy to set up a meeting in the first round at the Crucible Theatre with Stephen Lee.
Becoming the first Icelander to appear at the Crucible, Helgason lost 3–10.

In the last 48 at the 2002 China Open, Helgason faced Anthony Hamilton, building a 4–0 lead with consecutive breaks of 93, 91 and 83; however, Hamilton won the next five frames to run out a 5–4 victor.

Helgason played at the last 32 stage of a ranking event for the third time at the 2002 British Open; there, he defeated Jin Long, Ryan Day, Stuart Bingham, Patrick Wallace and Dave Harold, but lost 3–5 to Paul Hunter.

Having reached a career-high ranking of 66th for the 2003/2004 season, Helgason played in only the first two tournaments, losing in the LG Cup 4–5 to Ian Brumby and in the British Open, 4–5 to Michael Wild. He finished the season ranked 103rd, and lost his professional status at the age of 30.

He played in the Gibraltar Open during March 2020.

Performance and rankings timeline

Career finals

Amateur finals: 16 (12 titles)

External links 
 Kristjan Helgason at CueTracker.net: Snooker Results and Statistic Database

Kristján Helgason
Kristján Helgason
Living people
1974 births